The Death Star is a fictional giant military space station in the Star Wars universe, best known for its superweapon that can destroy planets.

Death Star may also refer to: The 1965 movie "Attack from Space" featured the original giant planet killing space station called the "Death Star".

Star Wars related
 Death Star (novel), a 2007 Star Wars novel by Michael Reaves and Steve Perry
 Death Star (ILM), the render farm of Industrial Light and Magic

Business
 Death Star (business), a fraudulent business strategy used by Enron to manipulate California's energy markets
 "Death Star", nickname of the AT&T Globe Symbol, the corporate logo designed by Saul Bass in 1983
 "Death Star", one of several nicknames for the Dallas Cowboys' AT&T Stadium in Arlington, Texas, U.S.
 "The Death Star", nickname for the Las Vegas Raiders' Allegiant Stadium in Paradise, Nevada, U.S.

Science and technology

Astronomy
 "Death Star", an episode of NOVA that discusses gamma ray bursts; see List of NOVA episodes
 "Death Star", nickname of Nemesis (hypothetical star), a hypothetical star theorized to cause periodic extinctions on Earth
 "Death Star", nickname of Mimas (moon), a moon of Saturn which coincidentally resembles the fictional Star Wars space station
 "Death Star Galaxy", 3C321.

Other science and technology
 "Deathstar", nickname of IBM Deskstar hard drives, particularly the unreliable 75GXP and 60GXP models
 "Death Star", nickname of the target chamber of the National Ignition Facility

Other
 Deathstar (video game) a 1984 video game for the BBC Micro and Acorn Electron computers
 "Death Star", a nickname of Ghroth, one of the fictional Ramsey Campbell deities of the Cthulhu Mythos
 "Death Star", nickname of the British military base RAF Mount Pleasant in the Falkland Islands
 "Death Star", nickname of the Queen Elizabeth University Hospital
 "Death Star", nickname of Allegiant Stadium, home of the Las Vegas Raiders

Music
 Deathstars, a Swedish industrial metal band formed in 2000
 xDEATHSTARx, an American Christian hardcore band formed in 2002

Songs
 Deathstar (Sevendust song), a 2007 song by Sevendust
 "Deth Star", a song by Tenacious D

See also
 Star Destroyer